Roy Payne (born November 11, 1967) is a former American stock car racing driver from Alvin, Texas. Payne competed in 44 NASCAR Busch Series races between 1993 and 1995, reaching the top ten twice. Payne competed in 41 ARCA races between 1991 and 1992, achieving 1 win, 17 top ten finishes, and 4 pole positions.

References

External links

1957 births
Living people
NASCAR drivers
ARCA Menards Series drivers